"Get My Drink On" is a song recorded by American country music singer Toby Keith, co-written by him, Scotty Emerick and Dean Dillon.  It was released in November 2007 as the third and final single from his CD Big Dog Daddy.

Content
The song describes a narrator whose lover has left him, so he decides to "get [his] drink on" (i. e., consume alcohol until he is intoxicated). "Get My Drink On" is an up-tempo song with primarily spoken-word lyrics delivered at a rapid pace.

Critical reception
Kevin John Coyne, reviewing the song for Country Universe, gave it an A− rating. He called the song "one of the best up-tempo romps in a career that’s been long on them in recent years."

Peak positions

Year-end charts

References

2007 singles
2007 songs
Toby Keith songs
Songs written by Dean Dillon
Songs written by Scotty Emerick
Songs written by Toby Keith
Show Dog-Universal Music singles
Songs about alcohol